Bni Hassane is a small town and rural commune in Azilal Province of the Tadla-Azilal region of Morocco. At the time of the 2004 census, the commune had a total population of 12,077 (2016) with 1759 households.

References

Populated places in Azilal Province
Rural communes of Béni Mellal-Khénifra